Nepal Internet Exchange is Nepal's only Internet exchange point, established to keep local traffic local and improve local web surfing with local content while saving international bandwidth. It was established in 2002 with the help of Packet Clearing House.

Locations 
NPIX Maintains two IX locations: One in Jawalkhel (Lalitpur), and another in Putalisadak (Kathmandu district). Members connect to one or both of these locations. The two facilities at Jawalakhel and Putalisadak run Cisco and Extreme switching platform respectively. Both locations provide 100Mbit/s, 1Gbit/s and 10Gbit/s ports to members.

Members 
NPIX members include major telcos, NSPs, ISPs, National Research Network and Anycast Operators. As of November 2020, the NPIX has 49 participating networks. NPIX is an open IXP allowing anyone with their own AS-Number and IP Address block to become a member and start an exchange of traffic with other members.

Among others, members include DNS Anycast operators providing instances of D, E, I, and L root name servers and over 100 gTLDs/ccTLDs.

Traffic 
As of November 2020, the exchange is producing about 14Gbit/s of Internet bandwidth.

See also 
 List of Internet exchange points

References

External links 
Nepal Internet Exchange

Internet exchange points in Asia
Telecommunications in Nepal